Buzet is an Appellation d'Origine Contrôlée (AOC) for wine in South West France, in the department of Lot-et-Garonne.

History
Originally known as Côtes de Buzet, it was a Vin Délimité de Qualité Supérieure from 1953, and was promoted to AOC status in 1973. In 1986, the name was changed from Côtes de Buzet to Buzet.

Geography
Buzet's production area is spread across  and is bordered by Garonne and the great Landes forest. The wine region stretches across 27 communes: Buzet-sur-Baïse.

Wine production

Grape varieties
The following grape varieties are used:
for white wines: Muscadelle, Sauvignon and Sémillon
for red wines: Cabernet Franc, Cabernet Sauvignon, Côt and Merlot.

See also
 List of vins de primeur

Notes and references

Bibliography
  Periodical: Les amis des côtes-de-buzet, Tome I, no.1-9, Autumn 1963 to Autumn 1967, Buzet-sur-Baïse. Periodical: Les amis des côtes-de-buzet, Tome II, no.10-18, Spring 1968 to Autumn 1972, Buzet-sur-Baïse. Periodical: Les amis des côtes-de-buzet, Special Edition, no.19-20, Spring 1973 to Autumn 1973, Buzet-sur-Baïse.

External links
The website for Buzet winemakers
The Buzet appellation put forward by www.vitis.org
The website of an independent Buzet winemaker, Domaine du Pech
The website for Chateau Sauvagneres (the Therasse family) 

South West France AOCs